1-Testosterone (abbreviated and nicknamed as 1-Testo, 1-T), also known as δ1-dihydrotestosterone (δ1-DHT), as well as dihydroboldenone, is a synthetic anabolic–androgenic steroid (AAS) and a 5α-reduced derivative of boldenone (Δ1-testosterone). It differs from testosterone by having a 1(2)-double bond instead of a 4(5)-double bond in its A ring. It was legally sold online in the United States until 2005, when it was reclassified as a Schedule III drug.

Side effects

Pharmacology

Pharmacodynamics
A 2006 study determined that 1-testosterone has a high androgenic and anabolic potency even without being metabolized, so it can be characterized as a typical anabolic steroid. 1-Testosterone binds in a manner that is highly selective to the androgen receptor (AR) and has a high potency to stimulate AR-dependent transactivation. In vivo, an equimolar dose of 1-testosterone has the same potency to stimulate the growth of the prostate, the seminal vesicles and the androgen-sensitive levator ani muscle as the reference anabolic steroid testosterone propionate, but, unlike testosterone propionate, 1-testosterone also increases liver weight.

Chemistry

1-Testosterone, IUPAC name 17β-hydroxy-5α-androst-1-en-3-one, also known as 4,5α-dihydro-δ1-testosterone (Δ1-DHT) or as 5α-androst-1-en-17β-ol-3-one, is a synthetic androstane steroid and a derivative of dihydrotestosterone (DHT).

Derivatives
Two prohormones of 1-testosterone are 1-androstenediol and 1-androstenedione, the latter of which may be synthesized from stanolone acetate.

Mesabolone is a ketal made from 1-testosterone. 

1-Testosterone also is known to be used to synthesize mestanolone and metenolone.

Methyl-1-testosterone is the 17α-methyl derivative of 1-testosterone.

Detection in body fluids
Doping with 1-testosterone can be detected in urine samples using gas chromatography.

References

Abandoned drugs
Secondary alcohols
Androgens and anabolic steroids
Androstanes
Ketones
World Anti-Doping Agency prohibited substances